Peter Millar may refer to:

Peter Millar (footballer) (1951–2013), Scottish footballer of the 1970s and 1980s
Peter Millar (journalist) (1955–2023), British journalist, critic and author
Peter Millar (soccer), Scottish-American soccer player of the 1960s and 1970s
Pete Millar (1929–2003), American illustrator, cartoonist, and drag racer
Peter Millar (RAF officer) (born 1942), British air marshal
Peter Millar (clothing company)

See also
Peter Miller (disambiguation)